Cantharellus texensis, the Texas chanterelle, is a species of Cantharellus from  Gulf of Mexico states and eastern United States.

References

External links
 
 

texensis
Fungi described in 2011